The United States was the host nation for the 2002 Winter Olympics in Salt Lake City, Utah.

These Games were by far the best home Winter Games for the United States, earning 34 total medals, nearly triple their best previous hauls at the 1960 Winter Olympics in Squaw Valley, California, and the 1932 Winter Olympics and 1980 Winter Olympics, both in Lake Placid, New York and the most a host country has won at a single Winter Olympics.

The United States also tied Norway at the 1994 Winter Olympics for most gold medals a host country has won at a Winter Olympics, with 10. Canada broke this record during the 2010 Winter Olympics.

The Olympics were held only months after September 11, 2001.  During the opening ceremonies, Jacques Rogge, presiding over his first Olympics as IOC president, told the American athletes that the world was gathered in their country and that their country was overcoming the "horrific tragedy" of that day and stands united with them in promoting the IOC's ideals.

Medalists

The following U.S. competitors won medals at the games. In the by discipline sections below, medalists' names are bolded. 

| width="78%" align="left" valign="top" |

| width=22% align=left valign=top |

Alpine skiing

Men

Women

Biathlon

Men

Women

Bobsleigh

Men

Women

Cross-country skiing

Distance
Men

Women

Sprint
Men

Women

Curling 

Summary

Men's tournament

Team
Superior CC, Superior
Skip: Tim Somerville 
Third: Mike Schneeberger 
Second: Myles Brundidge 
Lead: John Gordon 
Alternate: Donald Barcombe, Jr.

Round robin
Top four teams advanced to semi-finals.

Draw 1
February 11, 9:00

Draw 4
February 13, 9:00

Draw 6
February 14, 14:00

Draw 9
February 16, 14:00

Draw 12
February 18, 14:00

Draw 2
February 11, 19:00

Draw 5
February 13, 19:00

Draw 7
February 15, 9:00

Draw 11
February 17, 19:00

Women's tournament

Team
Bemidji CC, Bemidji
Skip: Kari Erickson 
Third: Debbie McCormick 
Second: Stacey Liapis 
Lead: Ann Swisshelm 
Alternate: Joni Cotten

Round robin
Top four teams advanced to semi-finals.

Draw 2
February 12, 9:00

Draw 4
February 13, 14:00

Draw 6
February 14, 19:00

Draw 9
February 16, 19:00

Draw 11
February 18, 9:00

Draw 3
February 12, 19:00

Draw 5
February 14, 9:00

Draw 8
February 16, 9:00

Draw 10
February 17, 14:00

Semifinal
February 20, 9:00

Bronze Medal Game
February 21, 9:00

Figure skating

Individual

Mixed

Freestyle skiing

Men

Women

Ice hockey

Summary

Men's tournament

Team roster
Tony Amonte
Tom Barrasso
Chris Chelios
Adam Deadmarsh
Chris Drury
Mike Dunham
Bill Guerin
Phil Housley
Brett Hull
John LeClair
Brian Leetch
Aaron Miller
Mike Modano
Tom Poti
Brian Rafalski
Mike Richter
Jeremy Roenick
Brian Rolston
Gary Suter
Keith Tkachuk
Doug Weight
Mike York
Scott Young

First round

All times are local (UTC-7).

Quarterfinal

Semifinal

Gold medal game

Women's tournament

Team roster
Chris Bailey
Laurie Baker
Karyn Bye
Julie Chu
Natalie Darwitz
Sara DeCosta
Tricia Dunn-Luoma
Cammi Granato
Courtney Kennedy
Andrea Kilbourne
Katie King
Shelley Looney
Sue Merz
A.J. Mleczko
Tara Mounsey
Jenny Schmidgall-Potter
Angela Ruggiero
Sarah Tueting
Lyndsay Wall
Krissy Wendell

Preliminary round
Top two teams (shaded) advanced to semifinals.

All times are local (UTC-7).

Semifinal

Gold medal game

Luge

Men

Women

Nordic combined

Short track speed skating

Men

Women

Skeleton

Ski jumping

Snowboarding 

Halfpipe
Men

Women

Parallel
Men

Women

Speed skating

Men

Women

See also
United States at the 2002 Winter Paralympics

Notes and references

Notes

References
 

Nations at the 2002 Winter Olympics
2002
Olympics